Nils Ronald "Ron" Thunman (born 26 February 1932) is a retired vice admiral in the United States Navy. Thunman is the son of Swedish immigrants, and was raised in Springfield, Illinois, where he attended Springfield High School. During high school he played football, basketball and was in involved in track. After high school, he briefly attended the University of Illinois College of Civil Engineering. He graduated from the United States Naval Academy in 1954. Initially trained as a surface warfare officer, Thunman was given command of the patrol boat USS Marysville in 1957. Notable commands he later held include Commander, Submarine Forces Pacific (1979 to 1981), Deputy Chief of Naval Operations for Submarine Warfare (1981 to 1985) and Chief of Naval Education and Training (1985 to 1988). He retired in 1988.

He was Superintendent/President of the Valley Forge Military Academy and College in Wayne, Pennsylvania from 1 August 1990 to 1 September 1993. He is a member of the Springfield High School Hall of Fame and Springfield Sports Hall of Fame. He is president of CAE Electronics Corporation. He has also served in the directorship of Pinkerton Government Services, Illini Corporation and ABB Government Services Corporation.

References

1932 births
Living people
People from Springfield, Illinois
People from Lima, Ohio
United States Naval Academy alumni
United States submarine commanders
United States Navy admirals
Military personnel from Illinois